Haha Sound is the second studio album by English indie electronic band Broadcast. It was released on 11 August 2003 by Warp.

Haha Sound earned critical acclaim and became Broadcast's first charting album in the United States, where it reached the top 10 of the Billboard Dance/Electronic Albums chart.

Critical reception

Haha Sound received highly favourable reviews from music critics. Paul Clarke called the album "a dizzying ride" in his review for Jockey Slut. Pitchfork placed Haha Sound at number 121 on its list of the best albums of the 2000s. In 2007, the record was listed by The Guardian as one of "1000 Albums to Hear Before You Die".

Track listing
Songwriting credits are adapted from ASCAP.

Personnel
Credits are adapted from the album's liner notes.

 Broadcast – recording
 Neil Bullock – drums (tracks 1–12, 14)
 House – sleeve design
 P. Jenkins – drums (track 13)
 Nick Webb – mastering

Charts

Release history

References

External links
 
 

2003 albums
Broadcast (band) albums
Warp (record label) albums
Experimental pop albums
Dream pop albums by English artists
Psychedelic pop albums
Electronica albums by English artists